The Rock art Natural Reserve of Ceto, Cimbergo and Paspardo is a nature reserve located in Valle Camonica, Province of Brescia, Lombardy, Italy. It was established in 1988.

The Reserve is a large protected area, mostly wooded, which extends for about 290 ha. Inside the Reserve there are at least 420 rock surfaces with  rock engraves declared in 1979 World Heritage by UNESCO.

There are various itineraries and paths, but the main ones are: 
 Ceto: Area of Foppe 
 Cimbergo Area of Campanine
 Paspardo Areas of Plas, In Vall, Sottolaiolo

Gallery

References

External links
http://www.arterupestre.it
http://www.incisionirupestri.com

Nature reserves in Italy